Police Story: Confessions of a Lady Cop (1980) is a crime TV movie starring Karen Black and Don Murray, and directed by Lee H. Katzin.

Plot

Cast

References 
History of Television by Rick Marshall

External links 
 
 People, Picks and Pans Review: Police Story: Confessions of a Lady Cop, April 28, 1980, " . . Karen Black sympathetically plays an officer torn by demands of her personal and professional life in a poignant finale to one of TV's most distinctive efforts.  TUESDAY, APRIL 29."

1980 television films
1980 films
American television films
Films directed by Lee H. Katzin
NBC original programming
Films scored by Richard Markowitz